Cotaena plenella is a species of sedge moth in the genus Cotaena. It was described by August Busck in 1914. It is found in Panama and Costa Rica.

References

Moths described in 1914
Glyphipterigidae
Moths of Central America